Patrick Burgmeier (born 24 May 1980) is a Liechtenstein former footballer who played as a defender.

He played club football for USV Eschen/Mauren, FC Vaduz, FC Triesen, and FC Schaan. He won six caps for Liechtenstein. Burgmeier is the elder brother of fellow footballer Franz Burgmeier, born to Heinz and Elsbeth.

Honours

Club
Vaduz
 1. Liga Promotion: 2000–01
 Liechtensteiner Cup: 2000–01

References

External links

Living people
1980 births
Association football defenders
Liechtenstein footballers
Liechtenstein international footballers
FC Vaduz players
USV Eschen/Mauren players